Fateh-Ud-Duniya-Wa-Ud Din Wali-e-Mewat Raja Khanzada Jalal Khan Bahadur a.k.a. Jallu Khan, son of Khanzada Feroz Khan, was the Khanzada Rajput ruler of Mewat State from 1422 to 1443. He succeeded  his  father as Wali-e-Mewat in 1422.

Conflict with Delhi
In 1427, Sultan Mubarak Shah  of Delhi's Sayyid dynasty attacked Mewat. The Mewati army fortified themselves for one year in the hills of Tijara, after which the Delhi army retreated. This event marked the complete sovereignty of Khanzada Rajputs on Mewat.

Amber Fort Invasion
He captured Amber Fort in 1438, the stronghold of the Kachwaha Rajas, and carried away of one of its gates to Indor Fort.

Death 
Khanzada Jalal Khan died in 1443, after which he was succeeded by his son, Khanzada Ahmad Khan.

References

Mewat
Indian Muslims
Year of birth unknown